Statistics of Nadeshiko League Cup in the 2007 season.

Overview
Nippon TV Beleza won the championship.

Results

Qualifying round

Group A

Group B

Group C

Group D

Final round

Semifinals
Nippon TV Beleza 5-0 INAC Leonessa
Urawa Reds Ladies 1-1 (pen 4-2) TEPCO Mareeze

Final
Nippon TV Beleza 2-1 Urawa Reds Ladies

References

Nadeshiko League Cup
2007 in Japanese women's football